Mackrell may refer to:

Edwin Mackrell (1878–1965), Australian politician
Gyles Mackrell DFC GM (1888–1959), British tea planter who organised a rescue of WW2 refugees
John J. Mackrell (1879–1961), American lawyer and politician from New York
William Mackrell (1881–1917), New Zealand rugby footballer

See also
Charlton House, Charlton Mackrell, Grade II* listed house
Charlton Mackrell, village in the civil parish of The Charltons, Somerset, England
Mackel
Mackell
Mackerel